WSP USA, formerly WSP|Parsons Brinckerhoff and  Parsons Brinckerhoff, is a multinational engineering and design firm with approximately 14,000 employees. WSP stands for Williams Sale Partnership. The firm operates in the fields of strategic consulting, planning, engineering, construction management, energy, infrastructure and community planning. In 2013, the company was named the tenth largest U.S.-based engineering/design firm by Engineering News Record. In 2020, it was ranked #7 of the Top 500 Design Firms and #2 of the Top 100 Pure Designers by the same magazine.
On October 31, 2014, Parsons Brinckerhoff became a wholly owned independent subsidiary of WSP Global, a Canadian-based professional services firm. Parsons Brinckerhoff was renamed to WSP|Parsons Brinckerhoff, then to WSP USA in 2017. Together with WSP Global, WSP USA is one of the largest professional services firms in the world, with approximately 31,500 employees in 500 offices serving 39 countries.

History

Founded in 1885 in New York City by civil engineer William Barclay Parsons, among Parsons Brinckerhoff's earliest projects was the original IRT line of the New York City Subway, designed by Parsons Brinckerhoff and opened in 1904. Parsons Brinckerhoff also designed the Cape Cod Canal, which opened in 1914  and charted the course of a railway in China from Hankow (Wuhan) to Canton (Guangzhou), a line that is also still in use today. In 1906, Henry M. Brinckerhoff, a highway engineer, brought his expertise in electric railways to the firm. He is known for his co-invention of the third rail.

The firm has worked on some of the most notable infrastructure projects of the 20th century, including: the Detroit–Windsor Tunnel (1930); the Scheldt Tunnel in Antwerp, Belgium (1933); The Buzzards Bay Railroad Bridge on Cape Cod, Massachusetts (1935); The 1939 World's Fair in New York City; the Garden State Parkway in New Jersey (1957); the Hampton Roads Bridge-Tunnel in Virginia (1957); the Pell Bridge in Newport, Rhode Island (1969); the Strategic Petroleum Reserve (United States) (1980); the I-95/Fort McHenry Tunnel (1980); the H-3 Highway in Oahu, Hawaii (1997); the Sabiya Power Station in Kuwait (2000) and the rapid transit systems of San Francisco (1972); Atlanta (1979); Singapore (1987); Taipei (1996); and Caracas (1983).

Parsons Brinckerhoff was acquired by Balfour Beatty in October 2009 and operated as a wholly owned subsidiary of the Balfour Beatty plc. In October 2010 Balfour Beatty acquired Halsall Associates, which became a subsidiary of Parsons Brinckerhoff and part of its Canadian operations.

Acquisition by WSP Global

On October 31, 2014 Balfour Beatty sold Parsons Brinckerhoff to WSP Global. In 2017 Parsons Brinckerhoff changed its name to WSP USA. On September 3, 2014, it was announced that WSP Global had made an offer to purchase Parsons Brinckerhoff from Balfour Beatty plc for US$1.24 billion. The transaction closed on October 31, 2014 and Parsons Brinckerhoff became a wholly owned subsidiary of WSP Global. On January 10, 2017, it was announced that the brand Parsons Brinckerhoff would be retired and combined into the parent company, WSP Global. WSP|Parsons Brinckerhoff is now called WSP USA.

Following the acquisition of Louis Berger Group by WSP Global in 2018 for $400 million, the operations of Louis Berger Group in the United States were merged with WSP USA's. WSP USA acquired two US-based environmental consulting firms over the next two years: Ecology & Environment  (E & E) in 2019, and LT Environmental in 2020.

In 2021, WSP purchased Golder Associates, and in 2022 WSP acquired Wood PLC’s Environment & Infrastructure Solutions, Inc. business.

Current projects
The firm is involved in Long Island Rail Road's East Side Access to Grand Central Terminal in New York City, with a planned opening of December 2022. It is also involved with the redevelopment of LaGuardia Airport in New York City, announced in 2015, with an expected completion date of 2022. In 2018, it was selected as the lead firm for the Charlotte Douglas International Airport Airfield Expansion, with a targeted completion of 2022. It is working on the new Dallas Fort Worth International Airport Southwest End-Around Taxiway, with an expected completion date of 2021. In 2018, it started working on a master plan update for San Antonio International Airport.

Controversies
Parsons Brinckerhoff partnered with rival engineering firm Bechtel to build the troubled Big Dig in Boston, Massachusetts. The Big Dig, or Central Artery/Tunnel project as it was officially known, was intended to replace an elevated Interstate freeway and connecting roads with a tunnel system underneath Boston. The project was beset with bad engineering, shoddy workmanship, and the death of an automobile passenger as a poor ceiling design caused a tunnel roof section to collapse on a car in the tunnel, crushing the victim. The Big Dig was years over schedule and engineering costs to several times of Bechtel/Parsons Brinckerhoff's original estimates, from $8 Billion to in excess of $24 Billion. Due to the poor construction, it has been estimated that the Big Dig's life span will be far short of the original specification that taxpayers paid for. The tunnels still have "thousands of leaks" and substandard materials. Subsequent to the fatal tunnel ceiling collapse, light fixtures have been found to have been incorrectly installed and corroding, posing a risk of failure and falling to the tunnel roadway.

Parsons Brinckerhoff was also the lead engineering firm to build the Silver Spring, Maryland transportation center. Despite a ballooning budget and a project that has run far behind schedule, the transit center was poorly constructed and has not become operational due to poor design and workmanship. In April 2014, The Washington Post published an exposé on Parsons Brinckerhoff's troubled transit center, reporting that an independent report has found that the public would be at risk due to falling concrete and needs a significant redesign and upgrades.

Parsons Brinckerhoff was part of a lawsuit for Lane Cove Tunnel, Sydney, Australia. The claim by AMP Capital Investors for Australian $144 million was settled in September 2014. The basis of the claim was 'Misleading and defective conduct' but the settlement is on confidential terms with no admission of liability.

References

External links
 

American companies established in 1885
Engineering consulting firms of the United States
Construction and civil engineering companies of the United States
Consulting firms established in 1885
1885 establishments in New York (state)